How to Clean Everything is the debut album by the punk rock band Propagandhi, released in 1993 on Fat Wreck Chords.

Vocalist Chris Hannah said about the album:

On August 20, 2013, the album was re-released via Fat Wreck, on CD, green vinyl, and light blue/white vinyl with the songs "Pigs Will Pay", "Homophobes Are Just Mad Cause They Can't Get Laid" and "Leg-Hold Trap", plus four original demos.

Track listing
All songs written by Propagandhi, except where noted.

Personnel
Chris Hannah - guitar, vocals
Jord Samolesky - drums, background vocals
John K. Samson - bass, vocals

References

External links
 official lyrics
 album information at Fat Wreck Chords

1993 debut albums
Propagandhi albums
Fat Wreck Chords albums